The Libre Graphics Meeting (LGM) is an annual international convention for the discussion of free and open source software used with graphics; The first Libre Graphics Meeting was held in March 2006. Communities from Inkscape, GIMP, Krita, Scribus, sK1, Blender, Open Clip Art Library, Open Font Library, and more come together through the Create Project to assemble this annual conference. It was co-founded by Dave Neary and Dave Odin.

Overview
Held yearly since 2006 the Libre Graphics Meeting aims to attract developers, artists and professionals who use and improve free and open source software graphics applications. LGM aims to bring these people together in the cause of creating high quality free graphics applications; By collaborating it allows the development of cross-application assets like brushes and enhanced interoperability such as shared file formats.

Many of the separate groups take the opportunity to hold birds of a feather (BOF) sessions. For many individuals it is the only time they will get to see their team members in person.

Presentations

Many things are discussed at each Libre Graphics Meeting, including usability, standards, announcements, color management and furthering the use of free software graphics applications in professional environments.

Kinematic templates
At the University of Waterloo some original research was done in the field of creating drawing aids for graphics applications. The aim was to allow an artist to draw using templates that would improve the shape or correctness of a brush stroke while maintaining a natural look. This presentation was given by Michael Terry, the lead researcher on the project.

Professional adoption
Ginger Coons gave a presentation at LGM 2009 discussing what it will take to get free software graphics applications in the doors of professional environments and schools

Collaboration
As well as cross pollination of ideas the Libre Graphics Meeting allows the discussion of possible future collaboration.

Louis Suárez-Potts, OpenOffice.org's Community Development Manager and Community Lead was sent to the LGM 2007 to find ways that OpenOffice.org might be able to transcend the boundaries of a traditional office suite by collaborating with other open source projects. One of the ways that has been suggested was that open office could suggest another open source application when it could not perform the role a user required. For example when a user needed to edit an image in an office document, OpenOffice.org may suggest GIMP to fill the role required.

Locations of Libre Graphics Meetings

Main achievements
 Addition of color management to GIMP and Inkscape. 
 OpenRaster initiative to develop an exchange file format for raster graphics, supported by Krita, GEGL and MyPaint.
 Start of the UniConvertor project to provide Corel DRAW and WMF importers for Scribus, Inkscape and any other project willing to use them.
 KDE SC 4 graphics software using LibRaw instead of DCRaw to process Raw files, which is intended to achieve more consistent demosaicing, faster processing using OpenMP and better metadata extraction.
 LensFun library to automatically fix various lens distortions.
 Release of Open Clip Art Library 3.0.
 Release of Open Font Library publicly.
 Release of DeviantArt Developer API.
 Public showing of Milkymist.

See also

 Fontforge
 Open Source Developers' Conference
 Phatch

References

External links

 
 Libre Graphics Meeting - Report 2007
 Linux Format articles related to Libre Graphics Meeting
 Nathan Willis, Historic Libre Graphics Meeting set for next month, Linux.com February 21, 2006
 Nick Veitch, Libre Graphics Meeting 2006, Linux Format, March 21, 2006
 Nick Veitch, "Libre graphics", Linux Format n. 80, June 2006
 Nick Veitch, Interview: Oyvind Kolas, Linux Format no. 96, September 2007
 Nick Veitch, Interview: Louis Suárez-Potts, Linux Format no. 97 (Linux Format, October 2007 ([also available online)
 Nick Veitch, Libre Graphics 2008, Linux Format no. 109, September 2008
 Ted Gould, Art meets open source at Libre Graphics Meeting, Linux.com, May 15, 2007
 Linux.com article on 2008 LGM Fundraising Drive
 Nathan Willis, Press Release for 2009 Conference, Linux.com, April 11, 2008

Computer graphics conferences
Free-software conferences

Libre culture
Recurring events established in 2006